Khadeema Kallaru is a 1982 Indian Kannada film directed by Vijay and produced by V. Ravichandran. The film stars Ambareesh, Prabhakar, Jayamala and V. Ravichandran in lead roles. The film is Ravichandran's first film as an actor and second as a producer after Prema Matsara.

Cast
 Ambareesh as Raja
 Prabhakar as Ravi
 Jayamala as Usha
 Ravichandran as Johnny
 Kamala Kamesh
 Subhashini
 Shashikala
 Shakti Prasad
 Vajramuni
 Thoogudeepa Srinivas
 Sundar Krishna Urs

Soundtrack

References

External links
 Khadeema Kallaru

1982 films
1980s Kannada-language films
Films scored by Shankar–Ganesh
Films directed by Vijay (director)